The Capital Area Activities Conference (Or CAAC) is a high school sports league located in Central Michigan. It is a member of the Michigan High School Athletic Association (MHSAA). There are currently 19 member schools in the conference that come from the counties of Clinton, Eaton, Ingham, Ionia, and Livingston. The Capital Area Activities Conference Logo was designed by Lansing Catholic 2003 graduate Raymond B. Corey.

Member schools
The CAAC currently has 19 member schools:

 Note: The class and population size are from the 2019-20 MHSAA listings

Former members

Membership timeline

Sports
The CAAC offer many sports for boys and girls athletes during the fall, winter, and spring seasons.

Fall:
 Cross Country (Boys & Girls) 
 Football
 Golf (Girls)
 Soccer (Boys)
 Swimming & Diving (Girls)
 Tennis (Boys)
 Volleyball
Winter:
 Basketball (Boys & Girls)
 Bowling (Boys & Girls)
 Competitive Cheer
 Gymnastics 
 Ice Hockey
 Swimming & Diving (Boys)
 Wrestling
Spring:
 Baseball
 Golf (Boys)
 Lacrosse (Boys & Girls)
 Soccer (Girls)
 Softball
 Tennis (Girls)
 Track & Field (Boys & Girls)

History
The CAAC was created in 2003, consisting of 21 schools coming from the now defunct leagues of the Capital Area Conference, the Capital Circuit League, the Ingham County League, and the Mid-Michigan Athletic Conference. From 2003 to 2007 the conference was made up of three divisions (I, II, III): division I was made up of eight schools, divisions II was made up of seven schools, and division III was made up of six schools in each. At the start of the 2007–08 school year the league switched from I, II, III to color-based divisions (Blue, Gold, Red, and White), due to new schools joining the league. The 2012–13 season was when the league reached its peak number of schools in the league; the league consisted of 27 schools with the same blue, gold, red, white divisions. After two years of competition of 27 schools, the league went through major re-alignment after seven schools departed the league. Lakewood and Stockbridge left the CAAC, and created a new conference with five other schools, called the Greater Lansing Athletic Conference (GLAC). Jackson area schools, Jackson Northwest, Parma Western, Jackson Lumen Christi, as well as Charlotte left the conference and created the Interstate Eight Conference. Corunna made the decision to move east and join the Genesee Area Conference (GAC). The CAAC reduced to three divisions and eliminated the gold division. Currently the blue division has eight schools, the red has six, and the white has six also. Former league member Charlotte, which was one of the seven schools that left the conference at the start of the 2014–15 school year, to join the newly formed Interstate Eight Conference, will be leaving that conference and will be joining the CAAC once again at the start of the 2017–18 school year. The 2018–19 school year, the CAAC will go through re-alignment once again. DeWitt and Lansing Waverly will join the Blue, with East Lansing, Grand Ledge, Holt, Lansing Everett, and Okemos. In the Red, Fowlerville, Lansing Eastern and Williamston will be joining Haslett, Mason, and St. Johns. Charlotte and Lansing Sexton will move to the White with Eaton Rapids, Ionia, Lansing Catholic, and Portland. Jackson High School will be departing the league and join the Ann Arbor based Southeastern Conference (SEC).

Alignments

Past alignments

2003-2005 alignment
Division I:
 East Lansing
 Grand Ledge
 Holt 
 Jackson
 Lansing Eastern 
 Lansing Sexton
 Lansing Everett
 Okemos
Division II:
 Charlotte
 Eaton Rapids
 Ionia
 Jackson Lumen Christi
 Jackson Northwest
 Mason
 Waverly
Division III:
 DeWitt
 Fowlerville
 Haslett
 Lakewood
 Lansing Catholic
 Williamston

2005-2007 alignment
Division I:
 East Lansing
 Grand Ledge
 Holt 
 Jackson
 Lansing Eastern 
 Lansing Sexton
 Lansing Everett
 Okemos
Division II:
 Charlotte
 Eaton Rapids
 Ionia
 Jackson Lumen Christi
 Jackson Northwest
 Mason
 St. Johns
 Waverly
Division III:
 DeWitt
 Fowlerville
 Haslett
 Lakewood
 Lansing Catholic
 Williamston

2007-2011 alignment
Blue:
 East Lansing
 Grand Ledge
 Holt
 Jackson
 Lansing Eastern
 Lansing Everett
 Okemos
Gold:
 Charlotte
 DeWitt
 Eaton Rapids
 Fowlerville
 Haslett
 Ionia
Red:
 Jackson Lumen Christi
 Jackson Northwest
 Lansing Sexton
 Mason
 Owosso
 St. Johns
 Waverly
White:
 Corunna
 Lakewood
 Lansing Catholic
 Perry
 Portland
 Williamston

2011-2012
Blue:
 East Lansing
 Grand Ledge
 Holt
 Jackson
 Lansing Eastern
 Lansing Everett
 Lansing Sexton
 Okemos
Gold:
 Charlotte
 Eaton Rapids
 Jackson Lumen Christi
 Jackson Northwest
 Mason
 Waverly
Red:
 DeWitt
 Haslett
 Fowlerville
 Ionia
 Owosso
 St. Johns
White: 
 Corunna 
 Lakewood
 Lansing Catholic
 Perry
 Portland
 Williamston

2012-2014
Blue:
 East Lansing
 Grand Ledge
 Holt
 Jackson
 Lansing Eastern
 Lansing Everett
 Lansing Sexton
 Okemos
Gold:
 Charlotte
 Eaton Rapids
 Jackson Lumen Christi
 Jackson Northwest
 Mason
 Parma Western
 Waverly
Red:
 DeWitt
 Haslett
 Fowlerville
 Ionia
 Owosso
 St. Johns
White: 
 Corunna 
 Lakewood
 Lansing Catholic
 Portland
 Stockbridge
 Williamston

2014-2017
Blue:
 East Lansing 
 Grand Ledge
 Holt
 Jackson
 Lansing Eastern
 Lansing Everett
 Lansing Sexton
 Okemos
Red:
 DeWitt
 Haslett
 Mason
 Owosso
 St. Johns
 Waverly
White:
 Eaton Rapids
 Fowlerville
 Ionia
 Lansing Catholic
 Portland
 Williamston.

2018-present
Blue:
 DeWitt
 East Lansing
 Grand Ledge
 Holt
 Jackson
 Lansing Everett
 Okemos
 Waverly
Red:
 Fowlerville
 Haslett
 Lansing Eastern
 Mason
 St. Johns
 Williamston
White:
 Charlotte
 Eaton Rapids
 Ionia
 Lansing Catholic 
 Lansing Sexton
 Portland

*The CAAC did not allow Jackson Lumen Christi to play football in the league until 2012

References

External links
 CAAC official website
 https://caacsports.org/fall-sports/football/

Sports in Lansing, Michigan
Michigan high school sports conferences
High school sports conferences and leagues in the United States